Huacrish (possibly from Quechua Wakrish (from wakri) for "flash of lightning") is a mountain in the west of the Huayhuash mountain range in the Andes of Peru, about  high. It is located in the Ancash Region, Bolognesi Province, Pacllon District, and in the Lima Region, Cajatambo Province, Copa District. Huacrish lies on the sub-range west of Yerupaja, northeast of the mountain Auxilio and southeast of the Auxilio Lake.

References

Mountains of Peru
Mountains of Ancash Region
Mountains of Lima Region